Yitzhak Klepter (31 March 1950 – 8 December 2022) was an Israeli singer, composer and guitarist.

Biography
Yitzhak Klepter was born in Haifa and grew up in Tel Aviv. In elementary school, he was asked to give a presentation about the life of Winston Churchill. This was the source of his nickname "Churchill." At the age of 15, he founded his first band, "The Churchills." In the Israel Defense Forces, he served in the armored corps but switched to the armored corps band.In 1973, he joined Kaveret, often  referred to as Israel’s Beatles.

See also
Music of Israel

References

External links
Yitzhak Klepter website
 
 

he: יצחק קלפטר

1950 births
2022 deaths
Israeli guitarists 
Israeli musicians
Israeli singers
Israeli film score composers
Eurovision Song Contest entrants for Israel
Eurovision Song Contest entrants of 1974
Musicians from Haifa